Indian Queen Tavern and Black's Store is a historic hotel and store complex located at Charlestown, Cecil County, Maryland, USA. It consists of two mid-18th century structures: Black's Store, originally the Red Lyon Inn, and the Indian Queen Tavern, later called Hotel. The two taverns and their remaining outbuildings form a court.  The outbuildings include a log kitchen with a loft and a two-story smokehouse.

It was listed on the National Register of Historic Places in 1975.

References

External links
, including photo from 1997, at Maryland Historical Trust

Taverns in Maryland
Hotels in Maryland
Buildings and structures in Cecil County, Maryland
Commercial buildings on the National Register of Historic Places in Maryland
Hotel buildings on the National Register of Historic Places in Maryland
Commercial buildings completed in 1755
Drinking establishments on the National Register of Historic Places in Maryland
Historic American Buildings Survey in Maryland
National Register of Historic Places in Cecil County, Maryland